Jace Ryan Peterson (born May 9, 1990) is an American professional baseball second baseman for the Oakland Athletics of Major League Baseball (MLB). He has previously played in MLB for the San Diego Padres, Atlanta Braves, New York Yankees, Baltimore Orioles and Milwaukee Brewers.

Early life
Jace Peterson was born in Lake Charles, Louisiana on May 9, 1990, as the eldest of three children to Scott and Shawn Peterson. He was a three-sport athlete at Hamilton Christian Academy in his hometown, playing baseball, basketball, and football. Upon graduation, Peterson attended McNeese State University, where he played football and baseball for the McNeese State Cowboys. In his three-season collegiate baseball career, Peterson set a school record for stolen bases, with 78. He was drafted by the Padres in the supplemental first round (58th pick overall) of the 2011 Major League Baseball Draft and signed with the team for $624,600.

Professional career

Minor leagues
Peterson made his professional debut with the Eugene Emeralds in 2011. He played in 73 games, hitting .243/360/.333 with two home runs over 276 at-bats. In 2012, he played for the Fort Wayne TinCaps, hitting .286/.378/.392 in 444 at-bats over 117 games. He played the 2013 season with the Lake Elsinore Storm and hit .303/.382/.454 with seven home runs in 496 at-bats over 113 games. He started the 2014 season with the Double-A San Antonio Missions.  After appearing with the Major League club, he was optioned to the Triple-A El Paso Chihuahuas in May. While he had primarily played shortstop in his previous minor league assignments, he saw time at second, third, and short with El Paso.  In 2014, he hit .306/.406/.464 with two home runs in 248 at-bats over 68 games at Triple-A after batting .311 in 18 games at Double-A.

San Diego Padres
Peterson was called up to the Majors for the first time from Double-A on April 25, 2014, when Chase Headley strained his calf.  He made seven starts at third base before being optioned to Triple-A.  He was recalled on June 4 and took over at second base when Jedd Gyorko was placed on the disabled list with plantar fasciitis on June 6.  Peterson made ten starts at second before the Padres claimed Irving Falú off waivers and returned Peterson to Triple-A.  He had two other brief stints with the Padres in 2014, but was not part of the September roster expansion.  For the season, he went 6 for 53 at the plate.

Peterson was one of seven Padres selected to play in the Arizona Fall League, where Bud Black expressed a desire for Peterson to get some experience in the outfield.

Atlanta Braves
On December 19, 2014, the Padres traded Peterson, Max Fried, Dustin Peterson, and Mallex Smith to the Atlanta Braves in exchange for Justin Upton and Aaron Northcraft. Peterson was invited to spring training and made Braves' Opening Day roster. On May 16, 2015, Peterson came to bat in the top of the second inning against the Miami Marlins with the bases loaded, and hit his first career home run, a grand slam, off Marlins pitcher Mat Latos. The Braves went on to win, 5-3. Peterson ended the season with a .239 batting average, .314 on base percentage, and .335 slugging percentage. He was again named the Braves' primary second baseman at the start of the 2016 season, but struggled through April and lost playing time before being optioned to the Gwinnett Braves on May 2. On June 10, Peterson was recalled to the majors, after the trade of Kelly Johnson. Once he returned, Peterson improved his hitting and became a utility player, mainly sharing time at second base with Gordon Beckham. He remained a utility player through the end of 2016 and the entirety of 2017.

New York Yankees 
On January 5, 2018, Peterson signed a minor league contract with the Yankees with an invitation to spring training.  He was promoted to the major leagues on April 7, and played 3 games with the Yankees before returning to the minors on April 13, where he refused assignment and became a free agent.  He re-signed with the Yankees on April 16 and ultimately was designated for assignment again on April 22.

Baltimore Orioles
He was claimed off waivers by the Baltimore Orioles on April 24, 2018. In his first game with the team, Peterson hit a double and collected two RBI in three at-bats. He ended the season playing in 93 games for Baltimore, hitting .195 with 3 home runs and 28 RBI's. He was outrighted on November 1, then elected free agency. Peterson later re-signed to a minor league deal on November 20. He was released by the organization on July 16, 2019. Peterson re-signed on a minor league deal with the Orioles on July 19. On July 25, the Orioles selected Peterson's contract. On September 3, Peterson was designated for assignment. Peterson ended his season hitting .220 in 29 games with 2 home runs. He elected free agency on October 1.

Milwaukee Brewers
On December 17, 2019, Peterson signed a minor league contract with the Milwaukee Brewers. On August 22, 2020, Peterson had his contract selected to the active roster to replace Brock Holt, who was designated for assignment. On December 2, 2020, Peterson was nontendered by the Brewers. 

On January 13, 2021, Peterson re-signed with the Brewers on a minor league contract. On April 10, 2021, Peterson was selected to the active roster after Kolten Wong was placed on the injured list. He notched 5 hits in 24 at-bats before being placed on the injured list on April 23 with left thumb cryotherapy. On May 24, he was reinstated from the injured list and designated for assignment. He was outrighted to the Triple-A Nashville Sounds on May 26. On June 8, Peterson was re-selected to the active roster.

On November 30, the Brewers signed Peterson to a contract for the 2022 season.

Oakland Athletics
On December 13, 2022, Peterson signed a two-year contract with the Oakland Athletics.

Personal life
Peterson and wife Brianna Pugh, who played soccer for the University of Oregon, have a daughter, born in 2016. They live in Lake Charles, Louisiana. His sister-in-law is Olympian and World Cup champion United States women's national soccer team forward, Mallory Swanson, the wife of former Braves teammate Dansby Swanson.

References

External links

1990 births
Atlanta Braves players
Baltimore Orioles players
Baseball players from Louisiana
El Paso Chihuahuas players
Eugene Emeralds players
Fort Wayne TinCaps players
Lake Elsinore Storm players
Living people
Major League Baseball second basemen
McNeese Cowboys baseball players
McNeese Cowboys football players
Milwaukee Brewers players
New York Yankees players
Norfolk Tides players
San Antonio Missions players
San Diego Padres players
Sportspeople from Lake Charles, Louisiana
Gwinnett Braves players
Scranton/Wilkes-Barre RailRiders players
Nashville Sounds players